The Saharonim Prison is an Israeli detention facility for African asylum seekers located in the Negev desert. It is the largest of a planned four camps with its total capacity of 8,000 inmates. Together with the Ktzi'ot prison, Sadot prison and the Nachal Raviv tent camp they detain South Sudanese, Sudanese and Eritrean asylum seekers who crossed the border from Egypt to Israel.

Since 2010 provisions were made to detain the immigrants in the old Ktzi'ot Prison, formally used as a detention camp for Palestinians.

On January 10, 2012 the Israeli parliament (Knesset) voted a controversial amendment bill to the 1954 Prevention of Infiltration Law that made detention for up to three years possible for African immigrants, without trial. In the spring of 2012 the construction of the Saharonim Prison was started, exempt from most local and national regulations, as requested by the Israeli Defense Ministry.

Location 
The prison is located in the southern Negev desert, close to the Israeli-Egyptian border. 
The region is known for its harsh living conditions both in summer as in winter.

Controversies
On June 24, 2013 a hunger strike was started by 350 mostly Eritrean detainees in blocks 3 and 4 of the prison.
In a letter by one of the hunger strikers that was published in Hebrew, described their encounter with immigration authority officers during the hunger strike:

As of September 2013 there were around 1,800 refugees imprisoned, 1,400 of them in Saharonim and 400 in Ktziot.

In September 2013 the Supreme Court of Israel ruled that imprisoning African migrants for long periods is unconstitutional.

The court also ruled that migrants, refugees and asylum seekers detained in the Ktziot and Saharonim prisons should be released within 90 days and those that cross the border illegally can only be detained for one year in the future.
The Israeli government has responded by passing an amended law to reduce the period of detention to one year and proposed the indefinite detention in "open" detention centers without judicial review.

As of January 2014, some 2,500 asylum seekers are housed at Saharonim and Ktziot prisons, 41 of them are children imprisoned with their parents. Of these, 15 are infants and toddlers up to the age of two, and 26 are children up to the age of 10.

See also
Sudanese refugees in Israel
Illegal immigration from Africa to Israel

References

External links 
 "Until our hearts are completely hardened." Report on asylum procedures in Israel, Hotline for Refugees and Migrants, April 2012.
 Sudanese Refugees in Israel. Jewish virtual library.
 The Association of Sudanese Refugees in Israel. Facebook community.
 "Plitim". Israeli non-governmental organisation providing support to refugees.

Prisons in Israel
Buildings and structures in Southern District (Israel)